Kaveri is a tributary of the Narmada River in Madhya Pradesh, India. It has a length of 40 km, and a catchment area of 954 km².

The Kaveri river meets the Narmada river near Mandhata (Omkareshwar), around 882 km from Narmada's source. The Narmada Mahatmya texts, which glorify the Narmada river, extol the confluence (sangam) of Narmada and Kaveri as a holy place (tirtha). Along with its bigger namesake in the South, the Kaveri river of Madhya Pradesh has been mentioned in the Matsya and the Kurma Puranas.

The Matsya and the Padma Puranas declare:

According to the Matsya Purana, Kubera performed a tapas in honour of Shiva at the confluence of Kaveri and Narmada, which made him the lord of yakshas. The Kurma Purana also similarly praises the confluence, declaring that it  destroys guilts. It recommends that one should bathe and worship Shiva at this confluence. The Agni Purana also mentions a Kaveri sangama, which F. E. Pargiter identifies with the Kaveri-Narmada confluence.

References

Bibliography

External links 
 Mahismati, the Kaveri, and Maheswar

Rivers of Madhya Pradesh
Tributaries of the Narmada River
Rivers of India